Baki Davrak (born 1971) is a Turkish-German actor who is known for his leading role in the film The Edge of Heaven (Auf der anderen Seite) which won the Prix du scénario at the 2007 Cannes Film Festival.

Life
Baki Davrak received his training in Hannover and Berlin theatres. Although he has worked on numerous films, he continues to act in the theater.

Baki Davrak first gained attention in Kutluğ Ataman's 1997 film Lola and Billy the Kid and Thomas Arslan's 1999 film . After these films, Baki Davrak took a break from film productions and became a care taker of a park until Fatih Akin offered him the main role as Professor Nejat, a professor of Turkish descent who teaches German, in his 2007 film The Edge of Heaven. The film won several international prizes including best screenplay, best director, best supporting actor and best supporting actress. In the same year, Baki Davrak also appeared in Herald Bergmann's film, Brinkmanns Zorn (Brinkmann's Wrath).

Baki Davrak has also appeared in numerous television series and movies including Wolffs Revier, Eva Blond, and Meine verrückte türkische Hochzeit (made into the English ), though most of the roles were small. From January 2008 until August 2009, he took on the WDR radio scene as he played the role of Nadir Taraki, the main criminal investigator on the first four installments of a radio series.

In addition to acting, Baki Davrak also writes. His first volume of poetry was to be published in 2007, but was delayed.

Filmography

TV series

Web series

Film

References

External links

1971 births
Living people
People from Bad Säckingen
German people of Turkish descent
German male film actors
German male television actors
German male stage actors